

The Spartan C5 was a passenger and utility aircraft produced in small numbers in the United States in the early 1930s. It was a further, ultimately unsuccessful, attempt to market the Spartan C4, from which it was developed. Like its predecessor, the C5 was a high-wing, strut-braced monoplane with a fully enclosed cabin. Seating was increased to five places in place of the four seats of the C4. The C5 also incorporated a number of aerodynamic refinements, including a closely cowled engine and spatted mainwheels. The fuselage was constructed of welded steel tube and the wings from wood, and the whole aircraft covered in fabric. The empennage was also mostly constructed from wood, with metal ribs used in the fin and the whole assembly also covered in fabric.

Spartan was unable to sell the aircraft in any quantity, and eventually, built only four examples, including the prototype.

Variants
 C5-300 — version with Wright J-6 engine (3 built)
 C5-301 — version with Pratt & Whitney Wasp Junior engine (1 built)

Specifications (C5-301)

References

Notes

Bibliography
 
 
 
 

1930s United States civil utility aircraft
Spartan Aircraft Company aircraft
High-wing aircraft
Aircraft first flown in 1930